Glenea erythrodera is a species of beetle in the family Cerambycidae. It was described by Charles Joseph Gahan in 1907. It is found on Sumatra.

References

erythrodera
Beetles described in 1907